Short Hymn, Silent War is a Canadian short drama film, directed by Charles Officer and released in 2002. The film centres on four Black Canadian women coping with an epidemic of gun violence in their community.

The film's cast includes Ngozi Paul, Mpho Koaho, Karen Robinson, Robert B. Kennedy, Bobby Manning, Ashley Archer, Elizabeth Vida and Mary Wright.

The film received a Genie Award nomination for Best Live Action Short Film at the 24th Genie Awards.

The film was later distributed as a bonus feature on the DVD release of Officer's feature film Nurse.Fighter.Boy.

References

External links
 

2002 films
2002 short films
Canadian drama short films
Films directed by Charles Officer
Canadian Film Centre films
2000s English-language films
2010s Canadian films
2000s Canadian films